The United States Open Tennis Championships is a hardcourt tennis tournament held annually at Flushing Meadows, starting on the last Monday in August and lasting for two weeks. The tournament consists of five main championship events: men's and women's singles, men's and women's doubles, and mixed doubles, with additional tournaments for seniors, juniors, and wheelchair players.

In 2007, the boys' singles event was won by Ričardas Berankis of Lithuania who beat Jerzy Janowicz of Poland, 6–3, 6–4 in the final.

Seeds
The seeded players are listed below. They are shown by the round in which they were eliminated.

Draw

Final eight

Top half

Section 1

Section 2

Bottom half

Section 3

Section 4

External links
Draw

Boys' Singles
US Open, 2007 Boys' Singles